Kraka may refer to:

People
 Aslaug aka Kraka, a queen in Norse mythology who appears in Snorri's Edda, the Völsunga saga and in the saga of Ragnar Lodbrok as his third wife.
 Rolf Kraka, a legendary Danish king

Ships
 UC2 Kraka, a private submarine
 Kraka, a reproduction Viking ship, see Viking ship replica

Other uses
 Krákumál or the Lay of Kraka, a skaldic poem
 Acraea kraka, the kraka butterfly